The 2012–13 Wichita Thunder season was the 21st season of the Central Hockey League (CHL) franchise in Wichita, Kansas.

Off-season
The Wichita Thunder announced that the contract for Head Coach Kevin McClelland was extended through the 2014-15 CHL season.

Regular season

Conference standings

Schedule and results

Awards and records

Awards

Milestones

Transactions
The Thunder have been involved in the following transactions during the 2012–13 season.

Trades

Free agents acquired

Free agents lost

Players re-signed

Lost via retirement

Lost via Waivers

Roster

Player stats

Skaters

See also
 2012–13 CHL season

References

External links
 2012–13 Wichita Thunder season at Pointstreak

Wichita Thunder seasons
Wichita
Wichita